Bruce Douglas (born April 9, 1964) is a retired American professional basketball player. A 6'3" guard, he played varsity basketball for Quincy Senior High School four years, and was a four-year starter at the University of Illinois.  He also briefly played professionally with the Sacramento Kings and in the CBA.

High school
Douglas played on the varsity basketball team at Quincy High School all four years he was in school.  During his freshman year, he came off the bench, playing meaningful minutes for the team that finished second in the state with a 32–1 record.  He started his sophomore, junior, and senior seasons, and led the Blue Devils to their most successful seasons in the history of the program.  He led the team in scoring his sophomore year with 19.4 points per game.  His junior year, the Blue Devils went undefeated, won the state championship, and were named national champions.  He was named to both all-state and All-America teams, while leading the team in assists.  Douglas nearly led the team to another undefeated season his senior year.  The team finally lost the 1982 semifinal game, after a then-state record 64-game winning streak.  The team ended up with a third-place trophy, Douglas's third top-four state finish in his four years.  He was once again named to all-state teams, and was a Parade Magazine all-American.  He was named Mr. Basketball in the state of Illinois in 1982.  He finished among the leaders in every statistical category at Quincy High school.  He holds the record for points scored (2,040) and field goals made (890), and is second in rebounds (709) and assists (643).  He amassed an amazing 123–5 win–loss record during his four years at QHS.  Out of high school, he was recruited to play for Lou Henson at the University of Illinois.  In 2007, Douglas was voted one of the "100 Legends of the IHSA Boys Basketball Tournament," recognizing his superior performance in his appearances in the tournament.

College
Douglas started all four years he played at the University of Illinois.  He ran the show at point guard to four consecutive NCAA tournament appearances.  In the 1983–84 season, the Illini won the Big Ten championship, and went to the elite eight.  The team came just short of its first final four since 1952, losing a controversial game to the University of Kentucky, which was played in Rupp Arena.  Douglas finished a successful career with Illinois, ending up a leader in many statistical categories.  As of 2019, Douglas is 27th on the list of Illinois leading scorers with 1261 points.  His record for most minutes played was surpassed by Dee Brown in 2006.  He still holds the Illini record for career steals (324) and assists (765).  He earned first-team All Big Ten honors in 1984, second-team in '85 and '86, and honorable mention in '83.  He was a third-team all-American in 1984, and was the Big Ten Defensive Player of the Year in 1985 and '86.  In October 2004, Douglas was named to the Illinois All-Century Team.  Illinois fans voted him as one of the 20 best Fighting Illini basketball players in the 100-year history of the program.

Professional
Out of college, Douglas was selected in the third round of the 1986 NBA draft, going to the Sacramento Kings.  He played one season with the Kings, then went to play for a short time in the CBA.  After leaving the CBA, he pursued a career in business, and he now resides in the Chicago area.

Douglas returned to Blue Devil Gym on January 6, 2007 during the first Quincy High School/Quincy Notre Dame High School boys basketball game since 1971. He was one of the honorees to sign the Illinois High School Association's Hall of Fame ball, along with another former Quincy High player, Bruce Brothers.

Douglas returns to Quincy annually to run his free 'Shooting for Christ' Basketball Camp in conjunction with the Salvation Army's Ray & Joan Kroc Community Center.

Honors

High school

 1982 – Illinois Mr. Basketball
 1982 – McDonald's All-American
 1988 – Inducted into the Illinois Basketball Coaches Association's Hall of Fame as a player.
 2007 – Named one of the 100 Legends of the IHSA Boys Basketball Tournament.

College

 1983 – Honorable Mention All-Big Ten
 1984 – Team Co-MVP
 1984 – 1st Team All-Big Ten
 1984 – NCAA All-Regional Team
 1984 – Co-Big Ten Player of the Year
 1984 – 3rd Team All-American
 1985 – 2nd Team All-Big Ten
 1985 – Big Ten Defensive Player of the Year
 1986 – Team Captain
 1986 – 2nd Team All-Big Ten
 1986 – Big Ten Defensive Player of the Year
 2004 – Elected to the "Illini Men's Basketball All-Century Team".
 2008 – Honored as one of the thirty-three honored jerseys which hang in the State Farm Center to show regard for being the most decorated basketball players in the University of Illinois' history.

College statistics

University of Illinois

* All-time leader in University of Illinois history

NBA career statistics

Regular season 

|-
| style="text-align:left;"| 
| style="text-align:left;"| Kansas City
| 8 || 1 || 12.3 || .292 || .000 || .000 || 1.8 || 2.1 || 1.1 || 0.0 || 1.8
|-
|-class="sortbottom"
| style="text-align:center;" colspan=2| Career
| 8 || 1 || 12.3 || .292 || .000 || .000 || 1.8 || 2.1 || 1.1 || 0.0 || 1.8

References

 http://www.connecttristates.com/sports/story.aspx?id=775366#.UACSv5hnTyB
 Schuckman, M. (2006). Stand Up and Cheer: A Century of Blue Devils Basketball. The Quincy Herald-Whig.

External links
NBA stats @ basketballreference.com
Bruce Douglas in the Quincy Blue Devil Sports Hall of Fame

1964 births
Living people
African-American basketball players
All-American college men's basketball players
American men's basketball players
Basketball players from Illinois
Illinois Fighting Illini men's basketball players
McDonald's High School All-Americans
Parade High School All-Americans (boys' basketball)
Point guards
Rockford Lightning players
Sacramento Kings draft picks
Sacramento Kings players
Shooting guards
Sportspeople from Quincy, Illinois
21st-century African-American people
20th-century African-American sportspeople